Kikihia subalpina, commonly known as the subalpine green cicada, is a species of cicada that is endemic to New Zealand. This species was first described by George Hudson in 1891.

Identification notes. Green overall colour (bright green in live individuals) with lighter markings in grooves of pronotum and bold dark markings on mesonotum (often fainter than in K. horologium); with shorter, lighter body pubescence than K. horologium. Pronotum with median yellow line. Mesonotum with trace of a narrow bright orange-red patch between nearly touching inner obconical marks (live individuals, see photo from external hyperlink below). Underside of head with brownish to purple-pink genae (or cheeks) on each side of frons. Pro- and mesosternum with nearly triangular black patches. Coxae of forelegs usually with pinkish red patches. Abdomen usually with well defined dorsal median silvery stripe. Male tymbals with 2 long and 1–2 short ridges. Female pygophore generally with a thick black longitudinal mark on each side of middle dorsally. Body length: 18–22 mm (males); 20–24 mm (females). Wingspread: 46–57 mm (males); 50–62 (females). 

Range. New Zealand. North Island: Taranaki, Taupo, Hawke's Bay, Gisborne, Rangitikei, Wellington. South Island: Marlborough Sounds, Nelson, Kaikoura, Buller, Westland, Mid Canterbury, South Canterbury, Mackenzie, Otago Lakes, Dunedin, Fiordland. Stewart Island. 

Habitat. Subalpine scrub vegetation (e.g., Cassinia, Hebe, Phylocladus alpinus, Podocarpus nivalis), sometimes also in the canopy of Nothofagus solandri cliffortioides (central North Island); in scrublands on ridges down to about 100 m elevation (lower North Island); in forest canopy (e.g., Nothofagus, exotic plantations) from tree line to sea level, but rarely in true subalpine environments (South Island). 

Schematic illustration of characters of purple-pink genae (cheeks), sternum with nearly triangular patches, pinkish red coxae. 

Schematic illustration, Kikihia subalpina underside

References

Cicadas of New Zealand
Insects described in 1891
Endemic fauna of New Zealand
Taxa named by George Hudson
Cicadettini
Endemic insects of New Zealand